This is a list of the paintings by the British Pre-Raphaelite artist John William Waterhouse.

1870s

1880s

1890s

1900s

1910s

Waterhouse